The Nymphenburg Porcelain Manufactory (German: Porzellan Manufaktur Nymphenburg) is located at the Nördliche Schloßrondell in one of the Cavalier Houses in front of the Nymphenburg Palace in Munich, Germany, and since its establishment in 1747 has produced porcelain of high quality. It is one of the last porcelain producers in the world where every single part is made entirely by hand.

History 
After his accession in 1745 Maximilian III Joseph, Prince-Elector of Bavaria, commanded the establishment of manufacturing companies in order to bail out the state finances. On 11 November 1747 the first manufactory with potters and modelling shops, painting and writing rooms was set up at the Grüne Schlössl, Neudeck Castle formerly located in the area of the modern day Munich borough of Au-Haidhausen. Not until 1754 after Joseph Jakob Ringler had mastered the complex processes of production, regular manufacture of porcelain finally began to succeed. In the same year the rococo porcelain sculptor Franz Anton Bustelli came to work at the factory. In 1755 the factory received its first commission from the Bavarian court and in 1756 came the first success in painting the porcelain in colour. The skillful management of lawyer and entrepreneur Count Sigmund von Haimhausen ensured that by 1758 the factory was placed on a sound commercial footing. In 1761 the manufacture moved to a Cavalier house, a prestigious two-storey hipped roof building with a semicircular risalit center and structured plaster on the grand circle near the main entrance of the Nymphenburg Palace, where it is still located today.

Among the artists who followed Bustelli were Dominik Auliczek the elder (1734–1804) and Johann Peter Melchior. A great promoter of the works was Ludwig I, who gave them many commissions. Particular favourites were dinner services with copies of famous paintings or with Bavarian landscapes in an antique style.

In 1822 Friedrich von Gärtner, the fashionable architect, was appointed artistic director of the factory. In the middle of the 19th century its financial position deteriorated to the extent that in 1856 all artistic production was halted and it was decided to privatise the factory. It was leased out for the first time in 1862 and its focus shifted to the production of technical, medical and sanitary porcelain goods.

In 1887 Albert Bäuml (1855–1929) took a lease of the factory. His aim was to regain the previous high artistic level of the factory's products: it was Bäuml, for example, who "rediscovered" Bustelli. This aim was realised at around the turn of the 19th and 20th centuries and besides historical copies, elegant Jugendstil ceramics were developed.

The product range includes services, mocca cups, figurines, animal figurines, Bavarica, baskets, vases, maiolica, table decoration and accessories. The customers of these exquisite products include the international aristocracy, embassies, churches and palaces at home and abroad.

Since 1975 the factory has been leased by the Bavarian government to the Wittelsbach Compensation Fund (Wittelsbacher Ausgleichsfonds). In 2011 it was taken over by Prince Luitpold of Bavaria.

The Nymphenburg Palace also accommodates the Nymphenburg Porcelain Museum (the Bäuml Collection). Guided tours through the factory can be arranged by prior appointment. Nymphenburg Palace is known to have been the working place of artists and sculptors like Hanns Goebl, William Brand and Franz Anton Bustelli.

See also
 Porcelain manufacturing companies in Europe

References

Bibliography 
 Marita Krauss: Die königlich-bayerischen Hoflieferanten. Volk Verlag, Munich 2008,
 Katharina Hantschmann: Nymphenburger Porzellan 1797 bis 1847. Geschichte, Modelle, Dekore. Klinkhardt und Biermann, Munich 1996,
 Friedrich H. Hofmann: Geschichte der bayerischen Porzellan-Manufaktur Nymphenburg. 3 Volumes. Hiersemann, Leipzig 1921–1923, reprint: Scherer, Edition Arkanum, Berlin 1991, .
 Barbara Krafft, Max Oppel: 250 Jahre Porzellan-Manufaktur Nymphenburg 1747 – 1997. IP-Verlags-Gesellschaft, Munich 1997, .
 Timo Nüßlein: Paul Ludwig Troost (1878–1934). Böhlau, Wien u. a. 2012,
 Timo Nüßlein: Der „Erste Baumeister des Dritten Reichs“ und das Porzellan – Paul Ludwig Troost und die Staatliche Porzellanmanufaktur Nymphenburg, in: Keramos 220, Gesellschaft der Keramikfreunde, Deggendorf 2013.
 Arno Schönberger: Nymphenburger Porzellan. Prestel, Munich 1949 (Bilderhefte des Bayerischen Nationalmuseums München 4).
 Rainer Schuster: Nymphenburger Porzellan. Kostbarkeiten aus der Sammlung Bäuml und dem Residenzmuseum Munich. Bayerische Verwaltung der staatlichen Schlösser, Gärten und Seen, Munich 1997, .
 Rosel Termolen (Hrsg.): Nymphenburger Porzellan. 3. Auflage. Rosenheimer, Rosenheim 1997,
 Hans Thoma: Porzellan-Manufaktur Nymphenburg. 1747–1947. Zweihundert Jahre Nymphenburg. Bruckmann, Munich 1947.
 Alfred Ziffer: Nymphenburger Porzellan. Sammlung Bäuml. Arnold, Stuttgart 1997, .
 Rainer Schuster, 1997. Nymphenburger Porzellan. Kostbarkeiten aus der Sammlung Bäuml und dem Residenzmuseum München. Munich: Bayerische Verwaltung der staatlichen Schlösser, Gärten und Seen.

External links

 
 Museum of Nymphenburg Porcelain – Bavarian Administration of State-Owned Palaces, Gardens and Lakes

Luxury brands
Ceramics manufacturers of Germany
Buildings and structures in Munich
Manufacturing companies based in Munich
Bavarian Royal Warrant holders
German porcelain
1761 establishments in the Holy Roman Empire
Companies established in 1761